Ypatingasis būrys (Special Squad) or Special SD and German Security Police Squad (also colloquially strzelcy ponarscy ("Ponary riflemen" in Polish) (1941–1944) was a killing squad also known as the "Lithuanian equivalent of Sonderkommando", operating in the Vilnius Region. The unit, primarily composed of Lithuanian volunteers, was formed by the German occupational government and was subordinate to Einsatzkommando 9 and later to Sicherheitsdienst (SD) and Sicherheitspolizei (Sipo). The unit was subordinated to German police, and had no official autonomy.

History 

The name of the Vilnian Special Squad  was first mentioned in documents dated 15 July 1941. The Special Squad (YB) began as police units formed after Lithuania was occupied by Germany in 1941. Bubnys notes that it is difficult to answer two questions: how many members YB had and how many people they killed. Bubnys argues that the number of 100,000 victims attributed to the organization is inflated.

Composition and size of the unit 
Many members were volunteers, particularly recruited from the former members of the paramilitary nationalistic Lithuanian Riflemen's Union. It was composed primarily of Lithuanians, although according to Lithuanian historian Bubnys, a few Russians and a few Poles served in it as well.

There are different estimates regarding the size of the unit. Polish historian Czesław Michalski estimates that it grew from base of 50 while Tadeusz Piotrowski asserts about that there were 100 volunteers at its onset. According to Michalski, after its initial creation, at various times hundreds of people were members. Arūnas Bubnys states that it never exceeded a core of forty or fifty men. 118 names are known; 20 of the members have been prosecuted and punished. According to the Lithuanian historian Arūnas Bubnys, who cited the Polish historian Helena Pasierbska, during 1941–1944, approximately 108 men were members of YB.

Role in the Holocaust 
The squad members were used as guards and moved Jews from their apartments to the ghetto. YB also guarded the Gestapo headquarters in Vilnius, the prison on present-day Gediminas Avenue, as well as the Paneriai base. 

Together with German police, the squad participated in the Ponary massacre, where some 70,000 Jews were murdered, along with estimated 20,000 Poles and 8,000 Russian POWs, many from nearby Vilnius. YB was created to kill people and it killed people during its entire existence. It carried out most of the murders in 1941. YB killed people in Paneriai, Nemenčinė, Naujoji Vilnia, Varėna, Jašiūnai, Eišiškės, Trakai, Semeliškės, and Švenčionys. YB killed tens of thousands people, mostly Jews.

1943 
When Germans closed Vilnius' monasteries in 1943, YB guarded their facilities until Germans removed the seized property. In 1943 YB performed far fewer executions than in 1941–1942. From December 1943 Paneriai was guarded by an SS unit and by 1944, according to Lithuanian historian Bubnys, YB did not perform shootings in Paneriai.

From August 1943 YB was renamed to a Squad of 11th Battalion of Latvian Legion. Old identity documents were replaced with new documents of Latvian Legion troops. Despite the formal change, YB was still serving German Security Police and SD.

1944 
In July 1944 YB was moved to Kaunas and stationed at Ninth Fort. There YB guarded the prison and before retreating, killed 100 prisoners. Then YB was moved to Stutthof, where it escorted Jews to Toruń. It stayed there until April 1944, when it received orders to convoy Jews to Bydgoszcz. However, YB members fled from the approaching front and Jewish prisoners escaped. Some YB members successfully retreated to Germany; some stayed in the zone occupied by Red Army.

Uniforms 
Squad members were issued Soviet weapons and white armbands. Some of the squad members wore Lithuanian Army uniforms until 1942, when they were issued green SD uniforms with Swastika and skulls on caps. Squad members were also issued SD identity cards.

Commanders 
Amongst the original organizers of the squad were junior lieutenants Jakubka and Butkus. After 23 July 1941, the commanding officer was Juozas Šidlauskas. In November 1941, lieutenant Balys Norvaiša, became the commander of the squad and his deputy was lieutenant Balys Lukošius. By the end of 1943, Norvaiša and Lukošius were deployed to a self-defence battalion and command of the YB was transferred to sergeant Jonas Tumas. The longest-serving commander of YB was SS man Martin Weiss. Weiss not only directed executions but killed victims personally. In 1943 Weiss was replaced by private Fiedler.

Aftermath 
Ten YB members were sentenced and executed by Soviet authorities in 1945 (Jonas Oželis-Kazlauskas, Juozas Macys, Stasys Ukrinas, Mikas Bogotkevičius, Povilas Vaitulionis, Jonas Dvilainis, Vladas Mandeika, Borisas Baltūsis, Juozas Augustas, Jonas Norkevičius). In total, twenty YB members were convicted by Polish and Soviet authorities, four of them in Poland in the 70s. In 1972 Polish authorities arrested three men, one Polish (Jan Borkowski, who during the war used a Lithuanized version of his name, Jonas Barkauskas), and the other two of mixed Polish–Lithuanian ethnicity (Władysław Butkun aka Vladas Butkunas and Józef Miakisz aka Juozas Mikašius) and sentenced them to death. These sentences were later commuted to 25 years imprisonment. Other YB members died after the war or lived abroad.

See also
The Holocaust
The Holocaust in Poland
Holocaust in Lithuania
Lithuanian Security Police

References

External links
"Chronicles of the Vilna Ghetto": wartime photographs & documents – vilnaghetto.com
Can Lithuania face its Holocaust past? – Excerpts from lecture given by Dr. Efraim Zuroff, Director of the Wiesenthal Center, Jerusalem, at the conference on "Litvaks in the World," 28 August 2001.

Einsatzgruppen
Home front during World War II
Military history of Lithuania during World War II
Jewish Lithuanian history
Jewish Polish history
Lithuanian collaboration with Nazi Germany
The Holocaust in Lithuania
The Holocaust in Poland
Local participation in the Holocaust
Lithuania–Poland relations
Paneriai
Generalbezirk Litauen